Barnes is an English surname and rare given name. At the time of the British Census of 1881, the relative frequency of the surname Barnes was highest in Dorset (2.9 times the British average), followed by Wiltshire, Cumberland, Hampshire, Norfolk, Cambridgeshire, Buckinghamshire, Huntingdonshire, Lancashire and Sussex.

There are multiple theories of the origin of the surname; it is variously suggested to be of Anglo-Saxon, Norse, or Irish provenance. According to one etymology, the name is derived from Old English beorn (warrior), which is in turn of Old Norse origin. In another account, it was simply an occupational name for a person who works in a barn, or a topographic name for a person who lives near a barn.

People with the surname

Common entries
Alan Barnes (disambiguation)
Albert Barnes (disambiguation)
Alex Barnes (disambiguation)
Arthur Barnes (disambiguation)
Ben Barnes (disambiguation)
Billy Barnes (disambiguation)
Brian Barnes (disambiguation)
Chris Barnes (disambiguation)
David Barnes (disambiguation)
Edward Barnes (disambiguation)
Fred Barnes (disambiguation)
George Barnes (disambiguation)
Harry Barnes (disambiguation)
Henry Barnes (disambiguation)
Jack Barnes (disambiguation)
James Barnes (disambiguation)
Jim Barnes (disambiguation)
John Barnes (disambiguation)
Jonathan Barnes (disambiguation)
Linda Barnes (disambiguation)
Michael Barnes (disambiguation) 
Peter Barnes (disambiguation)
Richard Barnes (disambiguation)
Robert Barnes (disambiguation)
Ronald Barnes (disambiguation)
Thomas Barnes (disambiguation)
Walter Barnes (disambiguation)
William Barnes (disambiguation)

Arts
Annie Maria Barnes (1857–?; pen name, "Cousin Annie"), American journalist, editor, author
Barnabe Barnes (–1609), English poet
Carol Barnes (1944–2008), British newsreader
Catharine Weed Barnes (1851–1913), American photographer
Clive Barnes (1927–2008), theater and dance critic
Djuna Barnes (1892–1982), American author
Ernie Barnes (1938–2009), American painter
F. C. Barnes (aka Fair Cloth Barnes, 1929–2011), American pastor and gospel musician
Gustave Barnes (1877–1921) South Australian artist, musician and gallery curator
Hazel Barnes (1915–2008), American philosopher, author, and translator
Helen Barnes (1895–1925), American musical comedy actress 
J. J. Barnes (1943–2022), American singer and songwriter
Jason Barnes (drummer), American drummer with a robotic arm
Jennifer Lynn Barnes, American author
Jhane Barnes, American fashion designer
Jimmy Barnes (born 1956), Scottish-Australian rock musician
Julian Barnes (born 1946), British author
Kevin Barnes (born 1974), Sunlandic musician
Lucy Barnes (writer) (1780–1809), American writer
Mae Barnes (1907–1996), American singer and entertainer
Mahalia Barnes (born 1982) Australian singer-songwriter
Nate Barnes, American singer
Peter Barnes (playwright) (1931-2004), British playwright
Priscilla Barnes (born 1955), American actress
Ronald Barnes (carillonist) (1927–1997), American carillonist
Rory Barnes (born 1946), British–born Australian author
Steven Barnes (born 1952), American author
Will Barnes, musician, known professionally as Will Toledo

Politicians

General
Barnes Ratwatte (1883–1957), Sri Lankan Sinhala legislator and headman
Barnes Ratwatte II (died 2004), Sri Lankan Sinhala judge
Charles Barnes (1901–1998), member of the Australian House of Representatives
Rex Barnes (born 1959), Canadian politician
Sue Barnes (born 1952), Canadian politician
Warren Delabere Barnes (1865–1911), British colonial administrator

American politicians
Clark Barnes (born 1950), West Virginia politician
J. Franklin Barnes (1852–1914), New York politician
J. Mahlon Barnes (1866–1934), American Socialist political functionary
Jane M. Barnes (1926–2000), Illinois politician
Lyman Barnes (1855–1904), Wisconsin politician
Mandela Barnes (born 1986), Wisconsin politician
Orlando M. Barnes (1824–1899), Michigan politician
Orsamus S. Barnes (1830–1916), Michigan politician
Ramona Barnes (1938–2003), Alaska politician
Samuel H. Barnes (1808–1860), New York politician
Sylvester W. Barnes (1824–1862), Wisconsin politician
Tim Barnes (politician) (born 1958), Tennessee politician
Tina Rose Muna Barnes (born 1962), Guamanian politician
Wallace Barnes (1926–2020), Connecticut politician

Sciences
Carol A. Barnes, neuroscientist
Charles Reid Barnes (1858–1910), American botanist
Howard Turner Barnes (1873–1950), American-Canadian physicist
S. Barry Barnes, sociologist of science
Timothy Barnes (classicist) (born 1942), Professor of Classics in the University of Toronto 1976–2007
Trevor J. Barnes (born 1956), British-born Canadian geographer

Sports

General
Alexander Barnes, American chemist
Chester Barnes (1947–2021), English table tennis player
Elisabet Barnes (born 1977), Swedish long-distance runner living in the U.K.
Emre Zafer Barnes (born 1988), Jamaican-Turkish sprinter
Lacy Barnes-Mileham (born 1964), American discus thrower
Paddy Barnes, Irish boxer
Pinkie Barnes (1915–2012), English table tennis player
Sid Barnes (1916–1973), Australian cricketer
Simon Barnes, Chief Sports Writer of The Times
Stu Barnes (born 1970), Canadian hockey player
Sydney Barnes (1873–1967), English cricketer

Baseball
Austin Barnes, American baseball player
Bill Barnes (center fielder), American baseball player
Brandon Barnes (baseball), American baseball player
Danny Barnes (baseball) (born 1989), American baseball player and coach
Jacob Barnes (born 1990), American baseball player
Jeremy Barnes (baseball) (born 1987), American baseball coach
Joyce Barnes (1925–2017), All-American Girls Professional Baseball League player
Matt Barnes (baseball), American baseball pitcher for the Boston Red Sox
Ross Barnes (1850–1915), American baseball player

Basketball
Harrison Barnes (born 1992), American basketball player
Matt Barnes (born 1980), American basketball player
Marvin Barnes (1952–2014), American basketball player
Scottie Barnes (born 2001), American basketball player

Football (American)
Deion Barnes (born 1993), American football player
Nathanael C. Barnes (born December 30, 2005), American football player
Derrick Barnes (American football) (born 1999), American football player
Emery Barnes (1929–1998), American football player
Joe Barnes (born 1951), American football player
Johnnie Barnes (born 1968), American football player
Kalon Barnes (born 1998), American football player
Krys Barnes (born 1998), American football player
Reggie Barnes (running back) (born 1967), American football running back in the Canadian Football League
Reggie Barnes (linebacker) (born 1969), American football linebacker in the National Football League
T. J. Barnes (born 1990), American football player
Tavaris Barnes (born 1991), American football player

Football (soccer)
Colin Barnes (born 1957), English former professional footballer
Giles Barnes (born 1988), English footballer
Harvey Barnes (born 1997), English footballer
John Barnes (born 1963), Jamaican player and commentator in England
Phil Barnes (born 1979), English football goalkeeper
Walley Barnes, Welsh footballer and broadcaster

Rugby
Berrick Barnes, Australian rugby player
Stuart Barnes (born 1962), English rugby union player & commentator
Wayne Barnes (born 1979), English rugby union referee

Other
Carnella Barnes (1911–1997), African-American minister in the Disciples of Christ church
Edwin Barnes (1935–2019), British Roman Catholic priest
Ernest Barnes (1874–1953), English mathematician, scientist, theologian and churchman
Estela Barnes de Carlotto, Argentine human rights activist
Hiram Barnes (1832–1917), Australian stagecoach pioneer
Johnny Barnes (1924–2016), Bermudian eccentric
Joshua Barnes (1654–1712), English scholar
Julius H. Barnes (1873–1959), American industrialist
Pancho Barnes (1901–1975), American female aviator

Given name
 Barnes Compton (1830–1898), American planter and politician
 Barnes Murphy (born 1947), Irish Gaelic footballer
 Barnes Wallis (1887–1979), English scientist, engineer and inventor

Fictional characters

Literature
 Jake Barnes, the narrator and protagonist of Ernest Hemingway's 1926 novel The Sun Also Rises.
 Barnes, a soldier and supporting character of Darren Shan's 2012–16 novel series Zom-B.

Film
 Staff Sergeant Bob Barnes, portrayed by Tom Berenger in the 1986 film Platoon, as the platoon sergeant of the fictional 25th Infantry Division platoon depicted in the film.
 Leslie Barnes, portrayed by Art Evans in the 1990 film Die Hard 2, as the fictional Chief Engineer of a Washington, D.C. airport.
 Norville Barnes, portrayed by Tim Robbins in the 1994 film The Hudsucker Proxy, as the fictional inventor of the hula hoop.
 Barnes, portrayed by rapper Common in the [2009 film Terminator Salvation, as John Connor's right-hand man.
 Spencer Barnes played by Charles Grodin and impersonated by Jim Belushi in the film Taking Care of Business.
 The Barnes family from The Five Year Engagement including Suzie, Violet, Sylvia and George.
 Amy Barnes, portrayed by Anne Heche in the film Volcano (1997 film), as a geologist and seismologist.
 Bucky Barnes, portrayed by Sebastian Stan in the Marvel Cinematic Universe.

Television
 The Barnes family is notable as the archrivals of the Ewings in the 1978–1991 soap opera Dallas as well as the 2012 revival series of the same name. Notable members include Cliff, Pamela, Digger and Rebecca.
 The Barnes family of the British soap opera Hollyoaks, most notably including Amy, Kathy, Leah, Mike, and Sara.
 Binky Barnes, a character on the animated television series Arthur.
 C. J. Barnes, a character on the situation comedy 8 Simple Rules, portrayed by David Spade.
 Troy Barnes, a character on the situation comedy Community, portrayed by Donald Glover.
 Zoe Barnes, a character on the Netflix political drama House of Cards, portrayed by Kate Mara.
 Bucky Barnes, portrayed by Sebastian Stan in the Marvel Cinematic Universe's The Falcon and the Winter Soldier.

Comics
 Bucky Barnes, a Marvel Comics character who was Captain America's sidekick.
 Rikki Barnes, a Marvel character who used the aliases Bucky and Nomad
 Michael Barnes, one of the characters who used the alias Shield (Archie Comics)

See also
Barns (surname)

References 

English-language surnames
English given names
Masculine given names